La peor de mis bodas is a 2016 Peruvian comedy film directed by Adolfo Aguilar (in his directorial debut) and written by Sandro Ventura, Roberto Valdivieso & Percy Wong. It stars Maricarmen Marín and Gabriel Soto. It premiered on September 22, 2016, in Peruvian theaters.

Synopsis 
Maricielo is a mischievous vendor of party supplies who is tempted by the son of a millionaire to pose as the best wedding planner in Lima and thus ruin his father's marriage with his foolish bride.

Cast 
The actors participating in this film are:

 Maricarmen Marín as Maricielo
 Gabriel Soto as Salvador
 Ricky Tosso as Pablo
 Atilia Boschetti as Úrsula
 Emanuel Soriano as Fernando
 Alexandra Graña as Rosaura
 Carlos Casella as Juancito
 Darlene Rosas as Catalina
 Jesús Alzamora as José Alonso
 Thiago Vernal as Ignacio
 María Paz Gonzáles-Vigil as Mariluz
 Analú Polanco as Silvita
 Alicia Mercado as Estrellita

Reception 
La peor de mis bodas exceed 30,000 viewers on the first day of its theatrical release. In its first weekend in theaters, the film attracted 150,000 viewers. The film drew 396,500 viewers in its second weekend. In its third weekend, the film drew over 558,000 viewers. The film became the third most viewed Peruvian film of 2016 with 722,106 viewers.

Sequels 
Following the immediate success of the film, it was confirmed that a sequel titled La peor de mis bodas 2 (The worst of my weddings 2) would be made. It premiered on January 1, 2019, in Peruvian theaters. Quickly, the making of a third part was confirmed to be filming in March 2022. The premiere of the third part is scheduled for July 27, 2023 in Peruvian theaters.

References

External links 

 

2016 films
2016 comedy films
Peruvian comedy films
Big Bang Films films
2010s Spanish-language films
2010s Peruvian films
Films set in Peru
Films shot in Peru
Films about weddings
Films about father–daughter relationships
2016 directorial debut films